Enrique López Lavigne (born 1967) is a film producer with an extensive work in Spanish cinema. He is a cofounder of Apaches Entertainment (Apache Films).

Biography 
Enrique López Lavigne was born in Madrid in 1967, son to a Spanish father and a French mother. He studied law at the Complutense University of Madrid and then worked for a year as a lawyer in Paris. He began his career in media when he was 25 years old, entering to work for Sogecable and Canal+. Later in time he came to co-found Apaches Entertainment alongside .

In 2020, he was invited to membership in the AMPAS.

Together with Pablo Cruz and Diego Suárez Chialvo, he co-founded El Estudio, a production company with activity in Mexico, Spain and the United States.

References 

1967 births
Spanish film producers
Living people